Jakob van Domselaer (15 April 1890 in Nijkerk, Gelderland – 5 January 1960) was a Dutch composer.

Domselaer was born at Nijkerk, Netherlands.  In 1912, he traveled to Paris where he met the Dutch painter Piet Mondrian (1872–1944), eventually becoming a part of Mondrian's artistic circle known as "De Stijl."  Domselaer's piano suite Proeven van Stijlkunst (Experiments in Artistic Style, 1913–17) represented the first attempt to apply principles of Neo-Plasticism to music, and Mondrian asserted that pieces were created under the influence of the plus-minus painting he created around the year 1915 .  This austere, mathematically based music represents an important but as yet unacknowledged precedent to minimalism and has been little performed or recorded.  He died at Bergen, Netherlands.

Domselaer's students have included the Dutch composers Nico Schuyt  and Simeon ten Holt .

At the Berlage Concourse in 1988, the Dutch pianist Kees Wieringa was one of the prize winners, playing piano music by Domselaer. He released a recording featuring the music of Domselaer in 1994 (DO Records CD, DR 001).

He married Maaike Middelkoop, with whom he had three children. His son, Jaap van Domselaer (1923–1944), was a promising young poet when he was shot while trying to escape from German-occupied Netherlands to the liberated zone in 1944 . His daughter, Matie van Domselaer, married the situationists Constant Nieuwenhuys on 13 July 1942  and Asger Jorn in 1950 .

Recordings
 Recording by Kees Wieringa
 Recording on the Donemus Foundation's Composer's Voice label

References

External links 
Jakob van Domselaer Archive and biography at the Netherlands Music Institute

1890 births
1960 deaths
People from Nijkerk
20th-century classical composers
Dutch male classical composers
Dutch classical composers
De Stijl
20th-century Dutch male musicians